Kona is an Indian surname . Notable people with the surname include:

Neeraja Kona, South Indian costume designer
Kona Prabhakar Rao (1916–1990), former governor of Maharashtra and Sikkim
Kona Raghupathi, Indian politician
Kona Venkat (born 1965), Indian film screenwriter, producer, director and actor
Kona Srikar Bharat (born 1993), Indian cricketer

See also
Kona (disambiguation)